TDMA may refer to:
 Tridiagonal matrix algorithm, a mathematical system
 Time-division multiple access, a channel-access scheme
 Digital AMPS (IS-54 and IS-136), a 2G mobile-phone standard that uses time-division multiple access